Most SNP ("Bridge of the Slovak National Uprising"), commonly referred to as Most Slovenského národného povstania or the UFO Bridge, and named Nový most ("New Bridge") from 1993 to 2012, is a road bridge over the Danube in Bratislava, the capital of Slovakia. It is the world's longest bridge to have one pylon and one cable-stayed plane.

Its steel construction is suspended from steel cables, connected on the Petržalka side to two pillars. There are four lanes for motor traffic on the upper level and lanes for bicycles and pedestrians on the lower level. It is a member of The World Federation of Great Towers.

History
Since its construction in 1972 the bridge was called Most SNP ("Bridge of the Slovak National Uprising"), although locally it was simply called the New Bridge, being the second bridge to be built in the city over the river Danube.  In 1993, its name was officially changed by Bratislava City Council to Nový Most ("New Bridge") to reflect general usage.  However, another three bridges have been constructed since its opening, and so in 2012 the City Council voted to change the bridge's name back to Most SNP.  The change took effect on 29 August 2012, the 68th anniversary of the Slovak National Uprising.

The bridge was built between 1967 and 1972 under a project managed by A. Tesár, J. Lacko and I. Slameň. It officially opened on August 26, 1972.  A significant section of the Old Town below Bratislava Castle, which included nearly all of the Jewish quarter, was demolished to create the roadway that led to it.  On the other hand, the bridge improved access between Petržalka and the rest of the city.  Parts of the historic city walls were unearthed during construction.

Restaurant and observation deck 
A special attraction is the flying saucer-shaped structure atop the bridge's  pylon, housing an observation deck and a restaurant, which since 2005 has been called UFO (previously, Bystrica). The restaurant serves both traditional Slovak and international cuisine, describing its cuisine as "Mediterasian". It received the Restaurant of the Year award in 2011.

Both the restaurant and the observation deck offer panoramic views of Bratislava. They are reached using lifts located in the east pillar, accessed from the walking and cycling paths on either side of the bridge. Access to the lifts normally costs €7.40 as of November 2017, but this fee is deducted from the bill for restaurant guests.

The west pillar of the bridge tower houses an emergency staircase with 430 steps.

Gallery

See also 
 List of crossings of the Danube River
 List of Towers
 History of Bratislava
 Zhivopisny Bridge, a cable-stayed bridge in Moscow with a restaurant on the tower, which did not open so far

References

External links

UFO Restaurant 

New Bridge 
Panoramic view of Novy Most bridge & River Danube

Bridges over the Danube
Bridges in Bratislava
Cable-stayed bridges in Slovakia
20th-century architecture in Slovakia
Bridges completed in 1972
Observation towers in Slovakia
Transport in Bratislava
Inclined towers
Restaurant towers
Restaurants in Slovakia